Langenstein is a municipality in the district of Perg in the Austrian state of Upper Austria.

Geography
Langenstein lies in the Mühlviertel. About 27 percent of the municipality is forest, and 51 percent is farmland.

References

External links

Cities and towns in Perg District